Onostemma is a genus of harvestmen in the family Sclerosomatidae from Brazil.

Species
 Onostemma imitans Mello-Leitão, 1938
 Onostemma maculatipes Roewer, 1953

References

Harvestmen